La Voz (Spanish for The Voice) is a Uruguayan singing reality competition television series broadcast on Channel 10. Created by John de Mol, it premiered on March 7, 2022. Based on the original The Voice of Holland, and part of The Voice franchise, it aims to find unsigned singing talent (solo or duets, professional and amateur) contested by aspiring singers, age 16 or over, drawn from public auditions.

History 
On September 20, 2021, it was reported that the Channel 10 had won the rights to The Voice Uruguay after doubling down in negotiations due to the fact that both Teledoce and Channel 4 showed interest in acquiring the rights. On October 26, producer María Laura García announced that Max Capote would serve as music producer for the show, in charge of producing the bases and supervising the songs. On October 28, during the central edition of Subrayado Rubén Rada, a singer, composer and percussionist with a long career, was announced as the first coach of the contest. Days later, on November 9, Argentine singer-songwriter was confirmed Valeria Lynch, as the international coach that the format demands. On the 17th, Lucas Sugo was announced as the third coach, and finally, a week later, Agustín Casanova, who had served as a judge in the two seasons of Got Talent Uruguay, was announced as the fourth and last coach of the competition.

On February 8, 2022, a sneak peek was released, in which a female figure was shown in the dark, and on the 17th, it was confirmed that Natalia Oreiro would be the presenter of the show. On Monday 21, the advisors of the coaches were announced: Camila Sapin, member of the band Closet; Victoria Ripa, singer of Croupier Funk and ex-judge of the reality show Master Class broadcast by Teledoce; Alejandro Spuntone, ex-vocalist of La Trampa and vocalist of Spuntone-Mendaro and Proyecto Bifrost; and Juan Dittrich, a vocal coach.

The show's air date was confirmed on 1 March 2022 through its official Twitter account.

In August 2022, it was announced that the show commissioned The Voice Kids to air in 2023 along with the regular version.

Format

Blind auditions 
In the Audiciones a ciegas (Spanish for Blind auditions), the coaches listen to the participants from behind, without being able to see them. If they like what they hear, they can press their button to turn around and recruit them to their team. If more than one coach turns, the power shifts to the singer, who then decides which team they would like to be part of. Each coach will participate in the development of their team members, advising them, and sharing the secrets of their success.

Battle phase 
In the Batallas (Spanish for Battles) each coach must choose two or three members of they team to compete against each other and show who has the best voice. At the end of each presentation, once the vocal duel is over, the coach decides who continues in the competition.

Knockout stage 
In the third stage, a pair of participants from the same team perform at the same time, but individually. Each one has the possibility to sing a song of their choice, and they are also advised by special guests. After both presentations, each coach chooses a participant to advance to the next round.

Playoffs stage 
In the Playoffs, the participants sing individually in team rounds, and each coach must save two, who advance to the next stage, while the rest will go to a public vote. Through telephone or SMS voting, viewers will save two more, thus leaving four participants. After listening to each presentation, each coach selects two from their team.

Live shows 
In the fifth stage, each participant performs individually and live; the public chooses who goes to the next stage. Among the participants, each coach decides who will be given the opportunity to continue competing and who will be eliminated from the competition. In the next round, the spectators choose between the two remaining participants from each team, as well as each coach, whose decision is balanced with that of the public. In both the semi-final and the final, not only will individual songs be performed, but each finalist sings a duet with they coach. A public vote decides who will be the voice of Uruguay.

Series overview

Kids edition 
La Voz Kids is an Uruguayan kids talent show, based on the Dutch competition The Voice Kids, broadcast by Canal 10. In each season, contestants are trained by one of the four coaches, competing to win UYU$300 million and a contract with Universal Music.

Series overview

References

External links 

 Official website
 

Uruguay
2022 Uruguayan television series debuts
2020s Uruguayan television series debuts
Spanish-language television shows
Uruguayan reality television series
Uruguayan television series
Canal 10 (Uruguay) original programming